The Mytilenean Debate (also spelled "Mytilenaean Debate") was the Athenian Assembly concerning reprisals against the city-state of Mytilene, which had attempted unsuccessfully to shake off Athenian hegemony during the Peloponnesian War.  The Debate occurred in 427 BC; Thucydides reports it in book three of his History of the Peloponnesian War, and uses the events and the speeches as a major opportunity to reflect and to offer his views on the political and ideological impact of the war on the parties involved.

Causes for the revolt

Mytilene was one of the last non-tributary members of the Delian League which chose to man their own warships and send subjects to fight alongside the Athenian fleet.  Mytilene feared tributary democracy and did not want to be reduced to the status of other Athenian allies. In addition, Mytilene was different from most allies because it was ruled by an oligarchy. Mytilene had contemplated ending its alliance with Athens, but Sparta had rejected its appeal for an alliance to enable this. However, this rejection had been prior to the outbreak of the Peloponnesian War, which created an opportunity for the Mytilenians, who sent an envoy to Olympia in 428 BC to seek assistance from the Peloponnesians. The Mytilenians asked for direct help in Mytilene, but also for an invasion of Attica, pointing out that since Athens had recently been devastated by a plague it would have financial difficulties fighting on two fronts.

Thucydides represented the Mytilenian ambassadors at Olympia as arguing that Athens had taken advantage of the Delian League and used it as a mechanism for "enslaving" and exploiting other Greeks; that it was only a matter of time before they set their sights on Mytilene’s prosperous and autonomous island of Lesbos and forced it into their system of oppression; and that the Mytilenians could not wait for this and should pre-emptively break away before Athens forced its will upon them. The Peloponnesian League agreed to aid Mytilene.

It has been pointed out that these arguments are silent on a major motivation of the oligarchs towards rebellion.  The Mytilenian government sought the unification of the five city-states of Lesbos under their leadership. Athenian policy aimed to break up larger units within the confederacy and did not support consolidation of Mytilenian power.

The Mytilenean revolt

The Mytilenians began preparing for the revolt by filling in their harbours, erecting fortifications, building additional warships, and importing extra grain.   The preparations began to attract attention, and informants started reporting details to Athens. Information came from several sources. Three of the other states on the island, Antissa, Eresus, and Pyrrha, had oligarchic governments.  Methymna, however, had a democracy, and did not support the revolt or the unification of Lesbos. Some Mytilenians, known as proxenoi, also reported information to Athens. Proxenoi were a small faction of political opponents, whose temperaments were compatible with Athenian democracy. Athens selected these officials to strengthen her position internally and prepare for the eventual removal of the oligarchies.
 
The Athenians responded to the news by attempting to intercept Peloponnesian aid and sending a fleet, led by Paches, to Lesbos. Upon arrival, Athens delivered an ultimatum, which ordered the Mytilenians to surrender and tear down their fortifications, but they refused and the rebellion ensued.  However, the Mytilenians were forced into revolt before they were militarily prepared to confront Athens, because the proxenoi alerted them of Mytilene's plans. As a result, the Mytilenians quickly lost and had to implement negotiating tactics to stall for time. In order to buy more time for Sparta, they called for a truce and sent representatives to Athens for negotiations.  The Mytilenian representatives called for the removal of the Athenian fleet, which the Athenians promptly denied, and fighting continued. All of Lesbos, other than Methymna, took arms against Athens, but Lesbos lost ground upon the arrival of more Athenian troops. Mytilene became surrounded by Athenian fortifications and were isolated by land and sea.

Finally, the Spartan Salaethus arrived and raised morale by reassuring the Mytilenians that the Peloponnesians were going to invade Attica and promised to supply them with a fleet in the spring.  As promised, Attica was invaded, but it did little to help the trapped islanders because the fleet never arrived and the food supplies had depleted. The final effort was made when Salaethus supplied the demos with hoplite arms. However, after the lower class was given arms they refused to follow orders and demanded that the oligarchs hand over the remainder of the food or else they would surrender.  The oligarchs could not meet the demos’ demand because there was no more food. After realizing the hopelessness of the situation, the oligarchs and the demos jointly initiated negotiations with Athens.

For all intents and purposes, Athens’ terms of negotiation were not much better than unconditional surrender, and the fate of the Mytilenian people rested on the decision of the Athenian people. The Mytilenians were only granted the right to send a delegation to Athens to plead for compassion, which was supported by Paches’ guarantee that no punitive actions would be taken until the Athenians agreed upon a conclusion.

The Mytilenean debate

Once the Mytilenians arrived in Athens, Salaethus was immediately executed and the assembly gathered to assess the situation and voted on the punitive actions that would be taken.  The Athenian assembly, scared of further revolt, hastily sentenced all of the male citizens of Mytilene to death, while the women and children would be sold into slavery. According to Thucydides, after the decision was made a trireme was dispatched to Mytilene to carry out the orders and the Athenians, enraged by premeditated revolt, slaughtered all of the prisoners, who numbered around a thousand.

The next day, the Athenians realized the unprecedented brutality of their actions and some became hesitant about the hurried decision to kill and enslave the citizens of Mytilene. A second debate, which Thucydides called the Mytilenian Debate, took place in order to reassess the course of action that should be taken. The debate consisted of varying opinions, the first of which was presented by Cleon of Athens. Cleon, a prominent member of Athenian society, spoke to defend the previous decision against doubts and to assert that the guilty party should get the punishment it deserved. Cleon's reputation was violent and ruthless. Indeed, Thucydides describes him as "the most violent man in Athens."

Cleon began by questioning the worth of a democracy: “Personally I have had occasion often enough already to observe that a democracy is incapable of governing others, and I am all the more convinced of this when I see how you are now changing your minds about the Mytilenians.”  He also implied the Athenians have become jaded by sophist oratory and questioned the worth of free speech. He described the Athenians as “victims of their own pleasure in listening, and are more like an audience sitting at the feet of a professional lecturer than a parliament discussing matters of state.” He finishes his speech by urging the populace to not "be traitors to your own selves."

After Cleon's speech, Diodotus spoke in defense of his previous opposition to the death sentence. He stated that "haste and anger are... the two greatest obstacles to wise counsel...." Diodotus argued the issue was not a question of Mytilene's guilt, and whether Athens should seek vengeance; rather it was a question of what is in Athens' best interest. Citing one of Cleon's main arguments for his position, Diodotus questioned whether the death penalty is really a means of deterrence from revolt or just the opposite. He finished by asking Athenians to fundamentally question what is right and just and look to moderation rather than aggressive punishment. Instead, he urged the Athenians to spare the Mytilenians in an effort to create an alliance. 
 
Following Diodotus’ speech, the assembly recast their votes. Diodotus’ rational argument prevailed and managed to persuade the assembly not to massacre the Mytilenians. The Athenians, who initially ardently supported the total annihilation of the Mytilenians, now found themselves hesitant. As a result, the votes, which were originally unanimous, were narrowly passed in favor of Diodotus.

Results of the debate

Ultimately, the Athenians were swayed by Diodotus’ argument and chose to spare the lives of the Mytilenians and to execute only the leaders of the revolt: another trireme, double-manned to row overnight, was promptly dispatched, and in a dramatic scene arrived at Lesbos just in time to prevent the previous orders from being carried out. Mytilene's oligarchy was removed and democracy installed; the Athenians razed the city walls and divided most of the Lesbian land, which was distributed to Athenians.

Thucydides' treatment of the events highlights some of the relative merits of oligarchy and democracy, as perceived at the time. It poses questions for Athens' treatment of its subject allies in the Delian League. James Boyd White suggests power was already corrupting the Athenians, though they still had a capacity for pity and compassion. This may be contrasted with the later Melian Dialogue—where Athens killed all the men and sold the women and children into slavery. Alternatively, the turn to Diodotus' rational interest over Cleon's appeal for just vengeance may mark the beginnings of the decline of appeals to justice and decline of the culture of argument in Athens.

See also
Melian dialogue

References

Citations

Sources 
 

Peloponnesian War
427 BC
Ancient Lesbos
Athenian democracy